Anthony Charles Sorrell (born 17 October 1966) is a former professional footballer who played in The Football League for Maidstone United, Colchester United and Barnet. He also played non-league football for Barking, Boston United and Dagenham & Redbridge.

Personal life
He is the nephew of former Chelsea and Leyton Orient footballer Dennis Sorrell. After retiring from football he worked as the director of London Pro Group, Pro Rail Construction and Pro Fabrication Ltd. As of 2012 he resided in Hornchurch, Greater London.

Honours
Maidstone United
Football Conference: 1988–89

References

English footballers
Barking F.C. players
Bishop's Stortford F.C. players
Maidstone United F.C. (1897) players
Boston United F.C. players
Colchester United F.C. players
Peterborough United F.C. players
Wycombe Wanderers F.C. players
Barnet F.C. players
Dagenham & Redbridge F.C. players
Romford F.C. players
English Football League players
National League (English football) players
1966 births
Living people
Association football midfielders
Footballers from Hornchurch